The 2023 cricket season will be the 16th season for the Indian Premier League franchise Kolkata Knight Riders (KKR). They will be one of the ten teams that will compete in the 2023 Indian Premier League. The franchise qualified for the IPL playoffs for the first time in 2011 and won the tournament in 2012 and 2014. The franchise also qualified for the playoffs in the three consecutive years of 2016, 2017 and 2018 as well as in 2021 when they were runners up.

Background
The team retained four players from the 2023 season ahead of the 2023 Auction
Retained Shreyas Iyer, Andre Russell, Varun Chakravarthy, Venkatesh Iyer, Sunil Narine, Nitish Rana, Umesh Yadav, Tim Southee, Rahmanullah Gurbaz, Anukul Roy, Rinku Singh, Harshit Rana

 Released Pat Cummins Shivam Mavi, Sam Billings, Aaron Finch, Alex Hales, Ajinkya Rahane, Mohammad Nabi, Sheldon Jackson, Ashok Sharma, Chamika Karunaratne, Abhijeet Tomar, Baba Indrajith, Pratham Singh, Ramesh Kumar, Rasikh Salam Dar

Current squad 
 Players with international caps are listed in bold.

Administration and support staff

References

Kolkata Knight Riders seasons
Cricket competitions